The Lebanon viper (Montivipera bornmuelleri), also known as Bornmueller's viper, is a species of venomous snake in the subfamily Viperinae of the family Viperidae. The species is native to Western Asia. There are no recognized subspecies.

Etymology
The specific name, bornmuelleri, is in honor of German botanist Joseph Friedrich Nicolaus Bornmüller.

Description
Males tend to be larger than females in some populations. The tail accounts for about 7–10% of the total length.

Geographic range and habitat
M. bornmuelleri is found in high mountain areas in Israel, Lebanon, and Syria. Its preferred natural habitats are cedar forest, shrubland, and alpine grassland.

Reproduction
M. bornmuelleri is viviparous.

Taxonomy
The original syntypes  of M. bornmuelleri were collected in Lebanon at 1800 m (5,900 ft) and in the Bolkar mountains of western Turkey at 2200 m (7,200 ft) as described by Franz Werner in 1898. In 1922, Werner restricted the type locality to Lebanon in his designation of his specimen as a lectotype, and in 1938 separated out the southern varieties as a separate species (Daboia palaestinae). In 1967 Mertens raised the name bornmuelleri to valid species rank for the Lebanese populations, thus leaving the name xanthina for all Turkish populations, which arrangement was accepted by Baran in 1976, and agreed with by Nilson and Andrén in their 1985 paper.

Conservation status
The species M. bornmuelleri is  classified as Endangered (EN) according to the IUCN Red List of Threatened Species with the following criteria: B1ab(iii) (v3.1, 2001). This indicates that it is facing a high risk of extinction in the wild because the extent of its occurrence within its geographic range is estimated to be less than 5,000 km² (1,931 sq mi), because its populations are severely fragmented or known to exist at no more than 5 locations, and because a continued decline is observed, inferred or projected in the area, extent and/or quality of its habitat.

References

Further reading
Garrigues T, Dauga C, Ferquel E, Choumet V, Failloux A-B (2005). "Molecular phylogeny of Vipera Laurenti, 1768 and the related genera Microvipera (Reuss, 1927) and Daboia (Gray, 1842), with comments about neurotoxic Vipera aspis aspis populations". Molecular Phylogenetics and Evolution 35 (1): 35–47.
Golay P, Smith HM, Broadley DG, Dixon JR, McCarthy CJ, Rage J-C, Schätti B, Toriba M (1993). Endoglyphs and other Major Venomous Snakes of the World. A Checklist. Geneva: Azemiops. 478 pp.
Obst FJ (1983). "Zur Kenntnis der Schlangengattung Vipera". Zoologische Abhandlungen, Staatliches Museum für Tierkunde in Dresden 38: 229–235. (in German).

Montivipera
Reptiles of the Middle East
Reptiles described in 1898